The Revenue Commissioners, commonly called Revenue, is the Irish Government agency responsible for customs, excise, taxation and related matters. Though Revenue can trace itself back to predecessors (with the Act of Union 1800 amalgamating its forerunners with HM Customs and Excise in the United Kingdom), the current organisation was created for the independent Irish Free State on 21 February 1923 by the Revenue Commissioners Order, 1923 which established the Revenue Commissioners to carry out the functions that the Commissioners of Inland Revenue and the Commissioners of Customs and Excise had carried out in the Free State prior to independence. The Revenue Commissioners are responsible to the Minister for Finance.

Overview
Revenue consists of a chairman and two commissioners, all of whom have the status of secretary general as used in Departments of State. The first commissioners, appointed by the then President of the Executive Council W. T. Cosgrave, were Charles J. Flynn, William Denis Carey and William T. O'Brien as chairman. The current Commissioners are: Chairman Niall Cody, and Commissioners Michael Gladney and Gerry Harrahill. According to its 2017 Annual Report, Revenue had 6,007 full-time equivalent staff in December 2017.

Revenue is based in Dublin Castle and uses a symbol of its gates as its logo, while its staff work in almost all of the 26 counties of the Republic of Ireland. The mission statement of Revenue is "to serve the community by fairly and efficiently collecting taxes and duties and implementing Customs controls".

From April 1979 until June 2000 Revenue had control of the issue of the Personal Public Service Number (then referred to as Revenue and Social Insurance Number) to individuals. In 1991 it delegated a block of numbers to the Department of Social Protection and on 19 June 2000, the issuing was transferred to the department entirely.

Since 1 July 2013 the Local Property Tax (LPT), an annual self-assessed tax charged on the market value of all residential properties in Ireland, has been collected by the Revenue Commissioners.

Notable cases

A number of cases involving the Revenue Commissioners have received widespread media attention and/or involved material funds:

Apple Inc
In August 2016, Revenue became central to the proposed application of what would have been the largest recorded tax fine in history. These findings were however rejected by Apple, Revenue and the Irish Government, and the findings (and fine) were later overturned by the EU's General Court.

Section 110 SPVs
US distressed debt funds were found to be using Section 110 SPVs to avoid material amounts of Irish taxes on their Irish domestic investments (a purpose for which these SPVs were not created). Revenue was the effective regulator (and gatekeeper) of Section 110 SPVs.  Finance Minister Michael Noonan moved to address the abuse in the Finance Act, 2016 and increase Revenue's oversight.

Customs cutters
The Revenue Commissioners presently operates two customs cutters for maritime patrols such as prevention of drug smuggling and illegal importation of other illicit goods into Ireland. The two cutters, R.C.C. Suirbheir and R.C.C Faire conduct patrols in Irish territorial waters and are assisted by the Irish Naval Service and the Garda Síochána in their work.

See also
 Taxation in the Republic of Ireland
 Corporation tax in the Republic of Ireland
 Criminal Assets Bureau
 Deposit Interest Retention Tax
 Irish vehicle registration plates
 Revenue On-Line Service
 UK Border Force
 Republic of Ireland–United Kingdom border

References

External links
Revenue.ie – Official site

Economy of the Republic of Ireland
Department of Finance (Ireland)
Revenue services
1923 establishments in Ireland
Government agencies established in 1923
Taxation in the Republic of Ireland
Customs services